The 1932 United States House of Representatives elections in South Carolina were held on November 8, 1932, to select six representatives for two-year terms from the state of South Carolina. The state lost a seat from redistricting that occurred from the 1930 census. Four incumbents were re-elected and the two open seats were retained by the Democrats. The composition of the state delegation thus remained solely Democratic.

1st congressional district
Incumbent Democratic Congressman Thomas S. McMillan of the 1st congressional district, in office since 1925, defeated Republican challenger D.C. Sharpe.

General election results

|-
| 
| colspan=5 |Democratic hold
|-

2nd congressional district
Following the 1930 census, South Carolina lost a congressional district due to redistricting. The 2nd congressional district was split between the 1st congressional district and the old 7th congressional district. Incumbent Democratic Congressmen Butler B. Hare and Hampton P. Fulmer were placed in the same district and Hare opted to retire rather than run against Fulmer in the newly constituted 2nd congressional district. Fulmer defeated Asbury Francis Lever in the Democratic primary and Republican challenger D.A. Gardner in the general election.

Democratic primary

General election results

|-
| 
| colspan=5 |Democratic hold
|-

3rd congressional district
Incumbent Democratic Congressman Frederick H. Dominick of the 3rd congressional district, in office since 1917, was defeated in the Democratic primary by John C. Taylor. He defeated Republican challenger T. Frank McCord in the general election.

Democratic primary

General election results

|-
| 
| colspan=5 |Democratic hold
|-

4th congressional district
Incumbent Democratic Congressman John J. McSwain of the 4th congressional district, in office since 1921, defeated Fred T. McCullough in the Democratic primary and Republican Otho Williams in the general election.

Democratic primary

General election results

|-
| 
| colspan=5 |Democratic hold
|-

5th congressional district
Incumbent Democratic Congressman William F. Stevenson of the 5th congressional district, in office since 1917, was defeated in the Democratic primary by James P. Richards. He defeated Republican challenger G.M. Williams in the general election.

Democratic primary

General election results

|-
| 
| colspan=5 |Democratic hold
|-

6th congressional district
Incumbent Democratic Congressman Allard H. Gasque of the 6th congressional district, in office since 1923, defeated E.S.C. Baker in the Democratic primary and Republican C.B. Ruffin in the general election.

Democratic primary

General election results

|-
| 
| colspan=5 |Democratic hold
|-

See also
United States House of Representatives elections, 1932
South Carolina's congressional districts

References

"Supplemental Report of the Secretary of State to the General Assembly of South Carolina." Reports of State Officers Boards and Committees to the General Assembly of the State of South Carolina. Volume I. Columbia, SC: 1933, pp. 7–9.

South Carolina
1932
1932 South Carolina elections